Daniel Lapaine (born 15 June 1971) is an Australian stage, film and television actor, currently residing in London. He also works as a writer and director.

Career 

Born in Sydney, New South Wales, to an Italian father and an Australian mother, Lapaine graduated from the National Institute of Dramatic Art (NIDA) in 1992. He first came to prominence in 1994 when he played the South African swimmer David Van Arckle in P. J. Hogan's Muriel's Wedding. Since then he has worked internationally in film, theatre, and television and is now based in London.

In theatre, he most recently he played Bassanio in The Merchant of Venice at Shakespeare's Globe, opposite Jonathan Pryce. Other theatre credits include the parts of Trip in Other Desert Cities and Eilert Lovborg in Ibsen's Hedda Gabler at the Old Vic, opposite Sheridan Smith. He played Leontes in The Winter's Tale at the Sheffield Crucible; Kurt in The Dance of Death at the Donmar at the Trafalgar Studios and George in All My Sons in the West End, opposite David Suchet. At the Royal Court, he appeared in Scenes from the Back of Beyond and F***ing Games, directed by Dominic Cooke. In Australia, Lapaine appeared at The Sydney Theatre Company in King Lear and Les Parents Terribles, "Island" at Belvoir Street and for the Bell Shakespeare Company he played Romeo in Romeo and Juliet as well as appearing in Hamlet and Richard III.

Lapaine has made two appearances in the UK TV Show Black Mirror, six years apart. First in 2011, as the morally dubious Max in "The Entire History of You", and later as the masochistic Dr. Dawson in 2017's "Black Museum".

Lapaine's recent film work includes Kathryn Bigelow's Oscar-winning Zero Dark Thirty, Last Chance Harvey opposite Dustin Hoffman and Emma Thompson, and Shanghai, opposite John Cusack. He played the lead role in Pathe's The Abduction Club and Miramax's Elephant Juice, as well as memorable appearances in Brokedown Palace opposite Claire Danes and Kate Beckinsale. He has also appeared in many other films including 54, Dangerous Beauty, Polish Wedding and Gozo.

Lapaine has worked extensively in television. He appeared in all four series of Catastrophe for Channel 4 and Amazon Prime, in which he plays the part of Dave. Entertainment Weekly named Catastrophe "the best new comedy of the year". He recently portrayed King Charles II in the Canal + series Versailles. Daniel also starred in the 2000 television miniseries The 10th Kingdom as Prince Wendell White, ruler of the 4th Kingdom, and played Tim Allerton in the 2004 Agatha Christie's Poirot episode Death on the Nile opposite David Suchet. In 2009, he portrayed Neil Armstrong in the television film Moon Shot. He also played Hector in Helen of Troy opposite Rufus Sewell. Other television credits include Critical; Vexed; Lewis; Vera; Identity; Hotel Babylon; Sex, the City and Me; Jane Hall; The Good Housekeeping Guide; The Golden Hour; Jericho; and I Saw You. In Australia, he appeared in A Country Practice and G.P., opposite Cate Blanchett.

Lapaine also wrote and directed the Australian feature film 48 Shades. Based on the 1999 novel 48 Shades of Brown by Nick Earls, the film was released in Australia by Buena Vista in 2006.

Personal life 

In 1998, Lapaine met English actress Fay Ripley at a party hosted by mutual friends. After meeting again on a trip in New York, they began dating. They married in October 2001 in a ceremony in Tuscany, Italy. In October 2002, the couple had their first child, a daughter named Parker. Their second child, a son, named Sonny, was born in October 2006.

Filmography

Film

Television

Video games

References

External links 

1971 births
Living people
Male actors from Sydney
National Institute of Dramatic Art alumni
Australian male film actors
Australian male television actors
People educated at St Aloysius' College (Sydney)
Australian expatriates in the United Kingdom
Australian people of Italian descent